The Lopasnya is a river in Moscow Oblast in Russia. It is a left tributary of the Oka. It is 108 km in length, with a drainage basin of 1090 km². Its average discharge is 6,76 m³/s.

References

Rivers of Moscow Oblast